Robert Hughes, Baron Hughes of Woodside (3 January 1932 – 7 January 2022) was a British Labour Party politician and life peer who served as a Member of Parliament (MP) for 27 years, and was also Chair of the British Anti-Apartheid Movement (AAM) from 1976 until it was dissolved in 1995 after the ending of apartheid in South Africa.

Political career
Hughes first stood for Parliament in 1959 at North Angus and Mearns, where he came second to the Conservative incumbent Colin Thornton-Kemsley. He was the Member of Parliament (MP) for Aberdeen North from 1970 to 1997.

Hughes was Parliamentary Under-Secretary of State for Scotland from March 1974 until July 1975, when he resigned in disagreement with the government's incomes policy.

The 1979 vote of no confidence resulted from the Labour government overturning the "Yes" result of the Scottish devolution referendum. Rather than the SNP, prime minister James Callaghan blamed unionist rebels on his own benches for ultimately bringing about the collapse of his government and opening the door to victory for Margaret Thatcher's Conservatives. Hughes was one of those rebels. Tam Dalyell, Peter Doig, and Adam Hunter were the other Scottish Labour MPs who helped overturn the "Yes" vote.

In November 1985 Hughes was appointed to the Shadow Cabinet as Shadow Secretary of State for Transport. On 27 September 1997, he was created a life peer as Baron Hughes of Woodside, of Woodside in the City of Aberdeen.

Anti-Apartheid Movement
Under his chairmanship the Anti-Apartheid Movement campaigned against the Thatcher government's refusal to impose sanctions against South Africa in the 1980s and organised the 1988 "Free Mandela" concert at Wembley Stadium which was televised by the BBC and broadcast around the world. Hughes attended the independence celebrations in Namibia in 1990 and acted as an observer at South Africa's first democratic elections in April 1994. After the dissolution of the AAM he became the first Chairperson of its successor organisation, ACTSA: Action for Southern Africa.

Personal life and death
Hughes was born on 3 January 1932, and educated at Robert Gordon's College, Aberdeen, and in South Africa, where he lived from 1947 until 1954 and worked as a draughtsman.

He was a patron of Humanists UK.

He died on 7 January 2022, four days after his 90th birthday, after a long illness. Tony Blair, Anas Sarwar and Peter Hain paid tribute to him, with Blair saying, "He was a lovely, kind and exceptional man and embodied all that is best in public service."

References

External links 
 

1932 births
2022 deaths
Amalgamated Engineering Union-sponsored MPs
People educated at Robert Gordon's College
Members of the Parliament of the United Kingdom for Aberdeen constituencies
Scottish Labour MPs
Hughes of Woodside
Life peers created by Elizabeth II
UK MPs 1970–1974
UK MPs 1974
UK MPs 1974–1979
UK MPs 1979–1983
UK MPs 1983–1987
UK MPs 1987–1992
UK MPs 1992–1997
British humanists
Anti-apartheid activists